The 2021 European Kata Judo Championships was a judo competition. It took place from 3–4 July 2021.

Medal summary

Some competitions did not have a bronze medal.

Medal table

Results
Source:

References

 Kata
European Championships,Kata
European Kata Championships
European Kata Championships